Brandan Alan Greczkowski (born July 18, 1977, in Norwich, Connecticut) is an American former judoka who was a three time U.S. champion and finished 7th at the 2000 Summer Olympics.  

In addition to his three U.S. championships, he finished second once and third twice.  He also won two bronze medals at the Pan-American championships. At the 2000 Summer Olympics He won three matches and lost two.  His losses were to three time Olympic champion Tadahiro Nomura and bronze medalist Aidyn Smagulov.

References

1977 births
Living people
American male judoka
Olympic judoka of the United States
Judoka at the 2000 Summer Olympics
People from Putnam, Connecticut
Sportspeople from Windham County, Connecticut